North Platte Public Schools (NPPS) is a public school district in North Platte (Lincoln County), Nebraska, United States.

Facilities 
Schools currently in operation by NPPS are shown in the following list.

 High schools (1): North Platte High School
 Middle schools (2): Adams Middle School and Madison Middle School
 Elementary schools (9) : Buffalo Elementary, Cody Elementary, Eisenhower Elementary, Jefferson Elementary, Lake Maloney Elementary, Lincoln Elementary, McDonald Elementary, Osgood Elementary, and Washington Elementary

NPPS also operates its main office building (McKinley Education Center), and a maintenance and bus barn building.

Schools formerly in use but have since been closed include Roosevelt, Cleveland, and Taft schools.

References

External links 
 North Platte Public Schools (district website)

School districts in Nebraska